Sugbongcogon, officially the Municipality of Sugbongcogon, is a 5th class municipality in the province of Misamis Oriental, Philippines. According to the 2020 census, it has a population of 9,764 people.

Geography

Barangays
Sugbongcogon is politically subdivided into 10 barangays.
 Alicomohan
 Ampianga
 Kaulayanan
 Kidampas
 Kiraging
 Mangga
 Mimbuahan
 Poblacion
 Santa Cruz
 Silad

Climate

Demographics

Economy

References

External links
 [ Philippine Standard Geographic Code]
Philippine Census Information
Local Governance Performance Management System

Municipalities of Misamis Oriental